Mercedes-Benz has sold a number of automobiles with the "560" model name:
 1986–1989 R107
 1986–1989 560SL
 1986–1991 W126
 1986–1991 560SEC
 1986–1991 560SEL
 1989–1991 560SE
 2013–current W222
 2018 S 560 4MATIC
 2018 Mercedes-Maybach S 560 4MATIC
 2018 S 560 e Plug-In Hybrid
 2014–current C217
 2018 S 560 Coupe 4MATIC
 2018 S 560 Cabriolet 4MATIC

560